This is a list of language histories.

History of the Bulgarian language
History of the Chinese language
History of the Czech language
History of Danish
History of English
History of Esperanto
History of French
History of German
History of Greek
History of Hindustani
History of Gan Chinese
History of the Hungarian language
History of Korean
History of the Macedonian language
History of the Malay language
History of the Russian language in Ukraine
History of Icelandic
History of Interlingua
History of the Irish language
History of Latin
History of Standard Chinese
History of the Spanish language
History of the Persian language
History of Polish
History of Portuguese
History of Quebec French
History of the Russian language
History of the Scots language
History of the Slovak language
History of Swedish
History of the Welsh language

 
Histories